Oberbrüden is a village in the district of Rems-Murr-Kreis in Baden-Württemberg in Germany. Population is about 2000 people. Together with the villages Unterbrüden, Ebersberg and Lippoldsweiler, Oberbrüden is part of the municipality Auenwald. In 2014 a 2000 year old Roman sunken lane between Steinbach and Oberbrüden was restored.

References

External links 
 Leo BW
 State Archive - Painting 1686

Rems-Murr-Kreis
Württemberg